United Independent School District is a school district headquartered in Laredo, Texas.

History 

The district was created in 1961 via the consolidation of the former Cactus, Johnson, and Nye school districts. The "Big Three" involved in the establishment of UISD were rancher Joe B. Finley, Amparo Gutierrez, and John W. Arndt, all of whom have schools named in their honor.

By the 2000s, United ISD had a rapidly growing student population due to the burgeoning populations of many colonias along the Texas-Mexico border. As of the 2000s, United ISD gains about 1,500 students per year.

On November 5, 2013, voters handily approved a $408.7 million school bond issue to acquire land, construct new schools, and expand other facilities. The tabulation in a low-turnout election was 5,148 (66.1 percent) in support and 2,643 (33.9 percent) in opposition.

In 2009, the school district was rated "academically acceptable" under the accountability ratings system used by the Texas Education Agency.

In 2023, Police lied to judge and falsified information to make a false arrest.

Service area
UISD serves portions of the city of Laredo, the cities of El Cenizo and Rio Bravo, and several unincorporated areas in Webb County. The census-designated places include:

Bonanza Hills
Botines
Colorado Acres
Four Points
Hillside Acres
La Coma
La Moca Ranch
La Presa
Las Haciendas
Las Pilas
Laredo Ranchettes
Laredo Ranchettes West
Los Altos
Los Arcos
Los Centenarios
Los Corralitos
Los Fresnos
Los Huisaches
Los Minerales
Los Nopalitos
Los Veteranos I
Los Veteranos II
Pueblo East
Pueblo Nuevo
Ranchitos East
Ranchitos Las Lomas
Ranchos Penitas West
San Carlos
San Carlos II
Sunset Acres
Tanquecitos South Acres
Tanquecitos South Acres II
Valle Verde

It also serves Larga Vista, now a part of Laredo.

United ISD's land area exceeds that of Delaware.

Standardized dress 
Students in pre-Kindergarten through 8th grades are required to follow standardized dress code provided by the district; the dress code began during the 2006-2007 school year. Since the 2007-2008 school year, high school students are also required to follow the same standardized dress code procedures as approved by the Board of Trustees.

The Texas Education Agency specified that the parents and/or guardians of students zoned to a school with uniforms may apply for a waiver to opt out of the uniform policy so their children do not have to wear the uniform; parents must specify "bona fide" reasons, such as religious reasons or philosophical objections.

Shortly before the 2021-2022 school year, the Board of Trustees passed a "casual dress code". However, some restrictions still apply.

Schools

High schools 

John B. Alexander High School (1994)
Lyndon B. Johnson High School (2001)
United High School (1963)
United South High School (1990)
Step Academy

Middle schools 

Antonio Gonzalez Middle School (2002)
Clark Middle School (1978)
George Washington Middle School (?)
Lamar Bruni Vergara Middle School (2006)
Los Obispos Middle School (?)
Raul Perales Middle School (?)
Ricardo Molina Middle School (2022)
Salvador Garcia Middle School (1995)
Trautmann Middle School (1996)
United Middle School (1984)
United South Middle School (1990)
Elias Herrera Middle School (2020)

Elementary schools 

John W. Arndt Elementary School
Colonel Santos Benavides Elementary School
Freedom Elementary School
Charles R. Borchers Elementary School, named for the former district attorney of the 49th Judicial District Court and former UISD board president Charles Robert Borchers of Laredo
Centeno Elementary School
Clark Elementary School
Henry Cuellar Elementary School
De Llano Elementary School
Barbara Fasken Elementary School
Finley Elementary School
National Blue Ribbon School 1998-99
Freedom Elementary School
Bonnie L. Garcia Elementary School
Amparo Gutierrez Elementary School
Juarez-Lincoln Elementary School
Kazen Elementary School
John F. Kennedy-Emiliano Zapata Elementary School
Killam Elementary School
Malakoff Elementary School
Julia Bird Jones Muller Elementary School
Newman Elementary School
Nye Elementary School
Perez Elementary School
Prada Elementary School
Roosevelt Elementary School
Ruiz Elementary School
Salinas Elementary School
Roberto J. Santos Elementary School
Trautmann Elementary School
Veterans Memorial Elementary School
Senator Judith Zaffirini Elementary School

 Former school
United D.D. Hachar Elementary School

References

External links 

 

 
School districts in Webb County, Texas
1961 establishments in Texas